Silver Swan may refer to:

Silver Swan (automaton), a clockwork display at the Bowes Museum
Silver Swan (brand), a condiments brand owned by Nutri-Asia
Silver Swan (comics), a fictional character in the Wonder Woman stories
"The Silver Swan" (madrigal), a madrigal by Orlando Gibbons
"Silver Swan Rag", a piano rag by Scott Joplin
Silver Swan, Milwaukee, a neighborhood of Milwaukee, Wisconsin